Alutaguse National Park is a national park in Eastern Estonia. The park was established in 2018. 

The park lies mostly on Alutaguse Lowland. This region is chararacterized by sparse settlement density and high percentages of natural landscapes. Roughly, 54% of the park is under bogs, and 42% is under forested landscapes.

Many rare species are living in the park, including flying squirrel, willow grouse, and black stork.

See also
 Protected areas of Estonia
 List of national parks in the Baltics

References

National parks of Estonia
Ida-Viru County
Protected areas established in 2018
Tourist attractions in Ida-Viru County